Edward Harold Browne (usually called Harold Browne; 6 March 1811 – 18 December 1891) was a bishop of the Church of England.

Early life and education
Browne was born on 6 March 1811 at Aylesbury, Buckinghamshire, the second son of Robert Browne of Morton House in Buckinghamshire, and of Sarah Dorothea Steward; and younger brother to Thomas Gore Browne. He was educated at Eton College and Emmanuel College, Cambridge. After securing his BA in 1832, he won the Crosse theological scholarship in 1833, the Tyrwhitt Hebrew scholarship in 1834, and the Norrisian prize in 1835. He graduated with his MA in 1836, was elected fellow of Emmanuel in 1837, and appointed senior tutor in 1838. In 1854 he was elected Norrisian Professor of Divinity at Cambridge. He took the BD in 1855 and the DD in 1864.

Early career
Browne was ordained deacon  on 26 November 1836 by Joseph Allen, Bishop of Ely; and priest, again by Allen, on 3 December 1837. In 1841, he accepted a curacy in Exeter (St Sidwell's), but in 1843 moved to Wales as Vice-Principal of St David's College. In 1849, he took a benefice in Cornwall, to which was attached a prebendal stall in Exeter Cathedral, which he exchanged in 1857 for a canonry in the same and the living of Heavitree.

Later career
In 1854, Browne was appointed to the Norrisian chair of divinity at the University of Cambridge but held his livings in the Diocese of Exeter concurrently. (The Cornish benefice was the vicarage of Kenwyn and Kea.) On 29 March 1864 he was consecrated Bishop of Ely by Charles Longley, Archbishop of Canterbury (assisted by Connop Thirlwall, Bishop of St David's and Henry Philpott, Bishop of Worcester) at Westminster Abbey; he was enthroned at Ely Cathedral on 26 April. During his time at Ely he returned to his hometown for the re-opening of a newly refurbished church of St. Mary the Virgin, Aylesbury in 1869. In December 1873, he was translated to the see of Winchester; he was enthroned at Winchester Cathedral on 11 December.

On Sunday 21 May 1885, Browne ordained as deacon of the first deaf-mute Anglican clergyman, Richard Aslatt Pearce.

Browne resigned his See in 1890 and died at Shales House near Bitterne on 18 December 1891.

Legacy
Browne was a high churchman and in 1885, he set up the first diocesan organisation of the Mothers' Union, which had previously been a simple parish meeting chaired by Mary Sumner in Old Alresford.

Browne was a moderating influence in the conflict arising from Essays and Reviews and the Pentateuch criticism of J. W. Colenso. His work,  held its place as a standard work for many years.

Publications
The inspiration of Holy Scripture: being an essay

Marriage and family
On 18 June 1840, Browne married Elizabeth Carlyon (daughter of Dr Clement Carlyon of Truro, Cornwall).

Styles and titles
1811–1836: Harold Browne Esq
1836–1849: The Reverend Harold Browne
1849–1854: The Reverend Prebendary Harold Browne
1854–1857: The Reverend Prebendary Professor Harold Browne
1857–1864: The Reverend Canon Professor Harold Browne
1864–1890: The Right Reverend Doctor Harold Browne

References

Sources

External links

"Bibliographic directory" from Project Canterbury

1811 births
1891 deaths
19th-century Church of England bishops
Alumni of Emmanuel College, Cambridge
Bishops of Ely
Bishops of Winchester
Fellows of Emmanuel College, Cambridge
Norrisian Professors of Divinity
People associated with the University of Wales, Lampeter
People educated at Eton College